The Black Domino is a 1929 German silent comedy film directed by Victor Janson and starring Hans Junkermann, Vera Schmiterlöw and Max Ehrlich. It is based on the 1837 comic opera Le domino noir. It was shot at the Staaken Studiosin Berlin. The film's art direction was by Botho Hoefer and Hans Minzloff.

Cast

References

Bibliography

External links

1929 films
1929 comedy films
German comedy films
Films of the Weimar Republic
German silent feature films
German black-and-white films
Films directed by Victor Janson
Films based on operas
Films based on works by Eugène Scribe
Silent comedy films
1920s German films
Films shot at Staaken Studios
1920s German-language films